Northcliffe Glacier is a glacier descending to the coast immediately east of Davis Peninsula, in Antarctica. It was discovered by the Australasian Antarctic Expedition, 1911–14, under Mawson, and named for Lord Northcliffe, of London, a patron of the expedition.

See also
 List of glaciers in the Antarctic
 Glaciology

References

Glaciers of Queen Mary Land